"El Pañuelo" (English: "The Handkerchief") is a song recorded by American singer Romeo Santos alongside Spanish singer and songwriter Rosalía. It was released on 2 September 2022 through Sony Latin as the third single of Santos' fifth studio album Formula, Vol. 3 (2022). The song, a bachata, was written and produced by both performers alongside Diego el Cigala, Alexander Caba, Joaquín Díaz and Ramón Jiménez. It samples and interpolates the 1985 track "No Sé Qué Hacer", performed by Carlos Manuel "El Zafiro".

Chart performance
Commercially, "El Pañuelo" entered major market charts including the Global 200, and the Billboard Hot Latin Songs. It peaked at number seven on the PROMUSICAE chart in Spain.

Music video
An accompanying music video for "El Pañuelo" filmed at an indoor studio in Los Angeles and produced by Canada and Park Pictures was shared on YouTube upon the record's release.

Personnel 
Production personnel

 Romeo Santos – production, lyrics, composition; vocals, vocal arrangement
 Rosalía Vila – lyrics, composition, vocal production; vocals, background vocals
 Mate Traxx – production, composition; drums, synthesizer
 Alexander Caba – composition; vocal arrangement: guitar
 Joaquín Díaz – composition; keyboards, piano, bass
 Juan Abel Martínez – guira, bongos
 Adán Gómez – bass
 Eric Rivera – guitar
 Isiah Parker – synthesizer

Technical personnel

 David Rodríguez – mixing
 Manny Marroquin – mixing
 Mate Traxx – assistant mix engineer
 Tom Brick – mastering

Charts

Certifications

Release history

References

2022 singles
2022 songs
Romeo Santos songs
Rosalía songs
Sony Music Latin singles
Songs written by Romeo Santos
Songs written by Rosalía
Bachata songs
Spanish-language songs
Male–female vocal duets